Merchant Ships was an American post-hardcore band from South Bend, Indiana.

History
Merchant Ships was formed in 2008 by singer Jack Senff and drummer Dwayne Robinson after both being inspired by local bands performances. Nick Stutsman and Michael Gerstein were recruited as the guitarist and bassist, respectively. Their first demo titled LOL Cats demo was released in July 2008. Their first proper release was an EP titled I Want To Forget About Everything Bad That Ever Happened, Ever via Antietam Records. They Later released their single "Old Grey" featured on the Simple Days Comp. In January 2009. 

In May 2009, Merchant Ships parted ways for the first time. In the summer of the same year, Jack and Nick Stutsman formed Midwest Pen Pals alongside Garrett Cabello and Mike Kenway and self-released their only official EP Inside Jokes. They ultimately broke up in September, 2009.  In 2010, Merchant Ships reunited and released their single "Better Days Ahead" featuring "Sentinel" and "Good Weekend". They later signed with Count Your Lucky Stars Records and released their second EP (first on the label) titled For Cameron in July 2010.

In July 2010, Merchant Ships broke up for good, releasing their full discography for free via their Myspace page along with a compilation entitled "Shipsography". The band was featured in Funeral Sounds article titled "Five Emo One-Release Wonders". Jack Senff went on to play in William Bonney with Gerstein, Kenway, Josh Miller, and Ethan Bonney. After William Bonney, Jack started North Folk, Boy Rex and Knola and began to release acoustic folk music under his full name "Jack M. Senff" on Skeletal Lightning Records.   Michael joined East Lansing based band Lucy.  Nick Stutsman went on to form South Bend emo band Park Jefferson while Dwyane Robinson joined the Bloomington based bands Hive Mind and House Olympics.

The band had planned a reunion show in late 2016 alongside longtime friends Sleep Patterns, but dropped the show shortly after. Senff made a lengthy statement about the situation on the band's official Facebook page, citing issues about not wanting to give Stutsman a platform due to allegations levied against him.

Band members
Jack Senff (vocals)
Nick Stutsman (guitar)
Michael Gerstein (bass)
Dwayne Robinson (drums)

Discography

EPs 
LOL Cats Demo (2008, self-released)
I Want To Forget About Everything That Ever Happened, Ever (2008, Antietam Records)
Bummer Times Demo (2009, self-released)
For Cameron (2010, Count Your Lucky Stars Records)
shipsography (2010, Records DK)

Compilations 
Shipsography (2010, self-released)

References

Musical groups from Indiana
Musical groups from Michigan
Musical groups established in 2008
Musical groups reestablished in 2010
2008 establishments in Indiana
Count Your Lucky Stars Records artists